Guareña is a Spanish municipality in the province of Badajoz, Extremadura. It has a population of 7,326 (2007) and an area of 283.3 km².

People from Guareña 
 Luis Chamizo Trigueros (1894 – 1945) was a Spanish writer in Castilian and "Castúo", a dialect in Extremadura.

References

External links
Official website 
Profile 

Municipalities in the Province of Badajoz